is a Japanese television series which premiered on Fuji TV on January 16, 2011. It was aired on Fuji TV's Sunday 9:00pm slot "Dramatic Sunday" in the 2011 winter drama season.

Plot
The story is about Shingū Elementary School which is beset by a lot of problems. Seichiro Naruse, a construction worker whose company closed down, suddenly becomes the principal of his old school. He must save the school from closing down.

Cast

Main Cast
 Yōsuke Eguchi as Seichiro Naruse
The construction company he was working in went bankrupt and he was appointed as the civilian principal of the Shingū Elementary School. Having devoted 20 years in the construction industry, he has no teaching license. He takes up the job in order to keep a promise he made with his former teacher and ex-principal Takeichi. Nonetheless, he has a cheerful personality and takes positive action at every turn, and he frequently describes himself as a "X X demon". He was greatly appalled by the appearance and the change in his alma mater, which was struggling to change the status quo. In the last episode, Shingū Elementary School narrowly avoided closing down, but at the same time, he resigned to take responsibility for the incident that was caused by Akira Hara in the school.

 Hidetoshi Nishijima as Iori Kirihara
He is the class teacher and curriculum coordinator for the sixth graders in Shingū Elementary School. Born April 10, 1971, he graduated from the Tokyo Gakugei University. Being one of the super-primary school teachers from the District Board of Education, he has the confidence from other faculty members. The realist can compete with Naruse and they are at odds with each other. He observes the students better than any other teacher and actually knows about the situation. He was transferred to Shingū Elementary School because of the accusation that he used violence on a student eight years ago. He used to be as enthusiastic as Naruse, but changed as a result of that incident.

 Kie Kitano as Kanoko Takeichi
 Takashi Tsukamoto as Hitoshi Ohashi
 Ittoku Kishibe as Mikishiro Takechi
 Miwako Ichikawa as Yukie Okamoto
She is the school nurse and a Gundam otaku. She is indifferent to politics in school, and owns a number of Gundam models. She is very sensitive of her own age and was the first amongst the school staff to know about the Kirihara's incident eight years ago.

 Shohei Miura as Yuichi Motoki
 Keiko Horiuchi as Yuriko Yoshimura
 Sansei Shiomi as Kujooro Wakiya

Students
 Abe Kōshō as Abe Takashi
 Nana Akashi as Nana Ishida
 Satoshinori Ichikawa as Ichimura Satoshinori
 Ayanatsu Itō as Kasumi Ito
 Shigeru Agatsuma as Ueno Shigeru
 Daiki Dakeyū as Daiki Dake
 Shārokku Reira as Reira Ogasawara
 Ābīarīya Asuka as Kyanberu Asuka
 Shimizu Yūshiya as Shimizu Toshiya

Episodes 

 All ratings are by Video Research, Ltd..
 Due to the 2011 Japanese earthquake, episode 9 was delayed and was broadcast together with episode 10.

Awards
Yōsuke Eguchi was placed 5th in best actor award for his role in this drama in the Nikkan Sports Drama Grand Prix (2011 winter season) with 227 votes.

References

External links
 

Japanese drama television series
2011 Japanese television series debuts
2011 Japanese television series endings
Fuji TV dramas